The coat of arms that serves as the symbol of the German-speaking Community of Belgium, a federal community in Belgium, was adopted in 1990.

History 
In 1989, there was a call for proposals for a flag and coat of arms of the German-speaking Community of Belgium. The decree establishing the symbols was adopted on 1 October 1990 and published on 15 November 1990.

Design 
The coat of arms of the German-speaking Community of Belgium is blazoned as In Silber ein roter Löwe begleitet von neun blauen Fünfblättern, von einer Königskrone überhöht, which is to say Argent, a lion Gules surrounded by nine cinquefoils Azure, surmounted by a royal crown.

The red lion alludes to the coat of arms of the Duchy of Luxemburg and the historical Duchy of Limburg, and symbolizes the historical affiliation of the German-speaking community to those states. The nine gentiana flowers represent the nine municipalities of the German-speaking community. Gentiana flowers grow in High Fens, an upland area and a nature reserve in the region. The crown further shows the allegiance of the German-speaking community of Belgium to the Kingdom of Belgium itself.

See also 
 Flag of the German-speaking Community of Belgium
 National symbols of Belgium
 Belgian heraldry
 German heraldry

References 

German-speaking Community of Belgium
German-speaking Community of Belgium
German-speaking Community of Belgium
German-speaking Community of Belgium
German-speaking Community of Belgium
German-speaking Community of Belgium
1990 establishments in Belgium